Tippah Creek may refer to:

North Tippah Creek
South Tippah Creek

See also
Tippah River